The history of the Māori began with the arrival of Polynesian settlers in New Zealand (Aotearoa in Māori), in a series of ocean migrations in canoes starting from the late 13th or early 14th centuries. Over several centuries of isolation, the Polynesian settlers formed a distinct culture that became known as the Māori.

Early Māori history is often divided into two periods: the Archaic period and the Classic period. Archaeological sites such as Wairau Bar show evidence of early life in Polynesian settlements in New Zealand. Many of the crops that the settlers brought from Polynesia did not grow well at all in the colder New Zealand climate, although many native bird and marine species were hunted, sometimes to extinction. An increasing population, competition for resources and changes in local climate led to social and cultural changes seen in the Classic period of Māori history. This period saw the emergence of a warrior culture and fortified villages, along with more elaborate cultural art forms. One group of Māori settled the Chatham Islands around 1500, forming a separate, pacifist culture known as the Moriori.

The arrival of Europeans to New Zealand, starting in 1642 with Abel Tasman, brought enormous changes to the Māori, who were introduced to Western food, technology, weapons and culture by European settlers, especially from Britain. In 1840 the British Crown and many Māori chiefs signed the Treaty of Waitangi, allowing New Zealand to become part of the British Empire and granting Māori the status of British subjects. Initial relations between Māori and Europeans (whom the Māori called "Pākehā") were largely amicable. However, rising tensions over disputed land sales led to conflict in the 1860s and large-scale land confiscations. Social upheaval and epidemics of introduced disease also took a devastating toll on the Māori people, causing their population to decline and their standing in New Zealand to diminish.

But by the start of the 20th century, the Māori population had begun to recover, and efforts have been made to increase their social, political, cultural and economic standing in wider New Zealand society. A protest movement gained support in the 1960s seeking redress for historical grievances. In the 2013 census, there were approximately 600,000 people in New Zealand identifying as Māori, making up roughly 15 per cent of the national population.

Origins from Polynesia

Evidence from genetics, archaeology, linguistics, and physical anthropology indicates that the ancestry of Polynesian people stretches all the way back to indigenous peoples of Taiwan. Language-evolution studies and mtDNA evidence suggest that most Pacific populations originated from Taiwanese indigenous peoples around 5,200 years ago. These Austronesian ancestors moved south to the Philippines where they settled for some time. From there, some eventually sailed southeast, skirting the northern and eastern fringes of Melanesia along the coasts of Papua New Guinea and the Bismarck Islands to the Solomon Islands where they again settled, leaving shards of their Lapita pottery behind and picking up a small amount of Melanesian DNA. From there, some migrated down to the western Polynesian islands of Samoa and Tonga while others island-hopped eastward, all the way from Otong Java in the Solomons to the Society Islands of Tahiti and Ra'iatea (once called Havai'i, or Hawaiki). From there, a succession of migrant waves colonised the rest of eastern Polynesia, as far as Hawai'i in the north, the Marquesas Islands and Rapa Nui (Easter Island) in the east, and lastly New Zealand in the far south.

Analysis by Kayser et al. (2008) discovered that only 21 per cent of the Māori-Polynesian autosomal gene pool is of Melanesian origin, with the rest (79 per cent) being of East Asian origin. Another study by Friedlaender et al. (2008) also confirmed that Polynesians are closer genetically to Micronesians, Taiwanese indigenous peoples, and East Asians, than to Melanesians. The study concluded that Polynesians moved through Melanesia fairly rapidly, allowing only limited admixture between Austronesians and Melanesians. The Polynesian population experienced a founder effect and genetic drift. Evidence of an ancestral phase in the southern Philippines comes from the discovery that Polynesians share about 40 per cent of their DNA with Filipinos from this area.

Settlement of New Zealand

In New Zealand, there are no human remains, artefacts or structures which are confidently dated to earlier than the Kaharoa Tephra, a layer of volcanic debris deposited by the Mount Tarawera eruption around 1314 CE. The 1999 dating of some kiore (Polynesian rat) bones to as early as 10 CE was later found to be an error. New samples of rat bone (and also of rat-gnawed shells and woody seed cases) gave dates later than the Tarawera eruption except for three which dated to a decade or so before the eruption.

Pollen evidence of widespread forest fires a decade or two before the eruption has led some scientists to speculate that humans may have lit them, in which case the first settlement date could have been somewhere in the period 1280–1320 CE which is now a widely quoted date. However, the most recent synthesis of archaeological and genetic evidence concludes that, whether or not some settlers arrived before the Tarawera eruption, the main settlement period was in the decades after it, somewhere between 1320 and 1350 CE, possibly involving a coordinated mass migration. This scenario is also consistent with a much debated third line of evidence – traditional genealogies which point to 1350 AD as a probable arrival date for many of the founding canoes from which most Māori trace their descent.

Hawaiki is the spiritual homeland of many eastern Polynesian societies and is widely considered to be mythical. However, a number of researchers think it is a real place – the traditionally important island of Raiatea in the Leeward Society Islands (in French Polynesia), which, in the local dialect, was called Havai'i. Migration accounts vary among tribes, whose members may identify with several waka in their genealogies.

With them the settlers brought a number of species which thrived: the kumara, taro, yams, gourd, tī, aute (paper mulberry) – and dogs and rats. It is likely that other species from their homeland were also brought, but did not survive the journey or thrive on arrival.

In the last few decades, mitochondrial-DNA (mtDNA) research has allowed an estimate to be made of the number of women in the founding population, of between 50 and 100.

Archaic period (1300–1500) 

The earliest period of Māori settlement is known as the "Archaic", "Moahunter" or "Colonisation" period. Other species, also now extinct, included the New Zealand swan, the New Zealand goose and the giant Haast's eagle, which preyed upon the moa. Marine mammals – seals in particular – thronged the coasts, with evidence of coastal colonies much further north than those which remain . Huge numbers of moa bones – estimated to be from between 29,000 and 90,000 birds – have been located at the mouth of the Waitaki River, between Timaru and Oamaru on the east coast of the South Island.

Archaeology has shown that the Otago region was the node of Māori cultural development during this time, and the majority of archaic settlements were on or within  of the coast. It was common for people to establish small temporary camps far inland for seasonal hunting. Settlements ranged in size from 40 people (e.g., Palliser Bay in Wellington) to between 300 and 400 people, with forty buildings (such as at Shag River).

The best-known and most extensively studied Archaic site is at Wairau Bar in the South Island. The site is similar to eastern Polynesian nucleated villages and is the only New Zealand archaeological site containing the bones of people who were born elsewhere. Radiocarbon dating of charcoal, human bone, moa bone, estuarine shells and moa eggshell has produced a wide range of date estimates, from the early 13th to the early 15th centuries, many of which might be contaminated by "inbuilt age" from older carbon which was eaten or absorbed by the sampled organisms. Due to tectonic forces, including several earthquakes and tsunamis since human arrival, some of the Wairau Bar site is now underwater. Work on the Wairau Bar skeletons in 2010 showed that life expectancy was very short, the oldest skeleton being 39 and most people dying in their 20s. Most of the adults showed signs of dietary or infection stress. Anaemia and arthritis were common. Infections such as tuberculosis (TB) may have been present, as the symptoms were present in several skeletons.

The Archaic period is remarkable for the lack of weapons and fortifications so typical of the later "Classic" Māori, and for its distinctive "reel necklaces". For a short period – less than 200 years – the early Māori diet included an abundance of large birds and fur seals that had never been hunted before. These animals rapidly declined: many, such as the various moa species, the New Zealand swan and the kohatu shag becoming extinct; while others, such as kakapo and seals were reduced in range and number.

Work by Helen Leach shows that Māori were using about 36 different food plants, although many required detoxification and long periods (12–24 hours) of cooking. D. Sutton's research on early Māori fertility found that first pregnancy occurred at about 20 years and the mean number of births was low, compared with other neolithic societies. The low number of births may have been due to the very low average life expectancy of 31–32 years. Analysis of skeletons at Wairau Bar showed signs of a hard life, with many having had broken bones that had healed. This suggests that the people ate a balanced diet and enjoyed a supportive community that had the resources to support severely injured family members.

Classic period (1500–1642) 

The cooling of the climate, confirmed by a detailed tree-ring study near Hokitika, shows a significant, sudden and long-lasting cooler period from 1500. This coincided with a series of massive earthquakes in the South Island Alpine fault, a major earthquake in 1460 in the Wellington area, tsunamis that destroyed many coastal settlements, and the extinction of the moa and other food species. These were likely factors that led to sweeping changes in the Māori culture, which developed into the "Classic" period that was in place at the time of European contact.

This period is characterised by finely made  (greenstone) weapons and ornaments, elaborately carved canoes – a tradition that was later extended to and continued in elaborately carved meeting houses called  – and a fierce warrior culture.

Around the year 1500, a group of Māori migrated east to Rēkohu, now known as the Chatham Islands. There they adapted to the local climate and the availability of resources and developed into a people known as the Moriori, related to but distinct from the Māori of mainland New Zealand. A notable feature of Moriori culture was an emphasis on pacifism. When a party of invading North Taranaki Māori arrived in 1835, few of the estimated Moriori population of 2,000 survived; they were killed outright and many were enslaved.

Early European contact (1642–1840) 

European settlement of New Zealand occurred in relatively recent historical times. New Zealand historian Michael King in The Penguin History Of New Zealand describes the Māori as "the last major human community on earth untouched and unaffected by the wider world". Early European explorers, including Abel Tasman (who arrived in 1642) and Captain James Cook (who first visited in 1769), recorded their impressions of Māori. Initial contact between Māori and Europeans proved problematic and sometimes fatal, with several accounts of Europeans being cannibalised.

From the 1780s, Māori encountered European and American sealers and whalers. Some Māori crewed on the foreign ships, with many crewing on whaling and sealing ships that operated in New Zealand waters. Some of the South Island crews were almost totally Māori. Between 1800 and 1820, there were 65 sealing voyages and 106 whaling voyages to New Zealand, mainly from Britain and Australia. A trickle of escaped convicts from Australia and deserters from visiting ships, as well as early Christian missionaries, also exposed the indigenous population to outside influences. During the Boyd Massacre in 1809, Māori took hostage and killed 66 members of the crew and passengers of the sailing ship Boyd in apparent revenge for the captain whipping the son of a Māori chief. Given accounts of cannibalism in this attack, shipping companies and missionaries kept their distance, significantly reducing their contact with the Māori for several years.

The runaways were of various standing within Māori society, ranging from slaves to high-ranking advisors. Some runaways remained little more than prisoners, while others abandoned European culture and identified as Māori. These Europeans "gone native" became known as Pākehā Māori. Many Māori valued them as a means to acquire European knowledge and technology, particularly firearms. When Whiria (Pōmare II) led a war-party against Tītore in 1838, he had 131 Europeans among his warriors. Frederick Edward Maning, an early settler, wrote two lively accounts of life in these times, which have become classics of New Zealand literature: Old New Zealand and History of the War in the North of New Zealand against the Chief Heke. European settlement of New Zealand increased steadily. By 1839, estimates placed the number of Europeans living among the Māori as high as 2,000, two-thirds of whom lived in the North Island, especially in the Northland Peninsula.

Between 1805 and 1840, the acquisition of muskets by tribes in close contact with European visitors drove a desperate need to acquire muskets to avoid extermination by, and allow aggression against, their neighbours; the recent introduction of the potato allowed more distant campaigns and more time for campaigning among Māori tribes. This led to a period of particularly bloody intertribal warfare known as the Musket Wars, in which many groups were decimated and others driven from their traditional territory. The absolute requirement for trade goods – mostly New Zealand flax, though  (tattooed heads) were also saleable – led many Māori to move to unhealthy swamplands where flax could be grown, and there to devote insufficient labour to the production of food, until any survivors were fully equipped, first with musket and ammunition, and then with iron tools. It has been estimated that during this period the Māori population dropped from about 100,000 (in 1800) to between 50,000 and 80,000 by the wars' end in 1843. The pacifist Moriori in the Chatham Islands similarly suffered massacre and subjugation at the hands of some Ngāti Mutunga and Ngāti Tama who had fled from the Taranaki region.

At the same time, the Māori suffered high mortality rates from Eurasian infectious diseases, such as influenza, smallpox and measles, which killed an unknown number of Māori: estimates vary between 10 and 50 per cent. The spread of epidemics resulted largely from the Māori lacking acquired immunity to the new diseases. The 1850s were a decade of relative stability and economic growth for Māori. A huge influx of European settlers in the 1870s increased contact between the indigenous people and the newcomers.

Te Rangi Hīroa documents an epidemic caused by a respiratory disease that Māori called . It "decimated" populations in the early 19th century and "spread with extraordinary virulence throughout the North Island and even to the South... Measles, typhoid, scarlet fever, whooping cough and almost everything, except plague and sleeping sickness, have taken their toll of Maori dead".

Contact with Europeans led to a sharing of concepts. The Māori language was first written down by Thomas Kendall in 1815, in A korao no New Zealand. This was followed five years later by A Grammar and Vocabulary of the New Zealand Language, compiled by Professor Samuel Lee and aided by Kendall, Waikato Māori and the chief Hongi Hika, on a visit to England in 1820. Māori quickly adopted writing as a means of sharing ideas, and many of their oral stories and poems were converted to the written form. Between February 1835 and January 1840, William Colenso printed 74,000 Māori-language booklets from his press at Paihia. In 1843, the government distributed free gazettes to Māori called Ko Te Karere O Nui Tireni. These contained information about law and crimes, with explanations and remarks about European customs, and were "designed to pass on official information to Māori and to encourage the idea that Pākehā and Māori were contracted together under the Treaty of Waitangi".

Treaty with the British Crown (1840) 

With increasing Christian missionary activity and growing European settlement in the 1830s, and with growing lawlessness in New Zealand, the British Crown acceded to repeated requests from missionaries and some chiefs to intervene. The British government sent Royal Navy Captain William Hobson with instructions to negotiate a treaty between the British Crown and the people of New Zealand. Soon after arrival in New Zealand in February 1840, Hobson negotiated a treaty with North Island chiefs, later to become known as the Treaty of Waitangi. In the end, 500 tribal chiefs and a small number of Europeans signed the Treaty, while some chiefs – such as Te Wherowhero in Waikato – refused to sign. The Treaty gave Māori the rights of British subjects and guaranteed Māori property rights and tribal autonomy, in return for accepting British sovereignty.

Considerable dispute continues over aspects of the Treaty of Waitangi. The original treaty was written mainly by James Busby and translated into Māori by Henry Williams, who was moderately proficient in Māori, and his son William, who was more skilled. They were handicapped by their imperfect Māori and the lack of exactly similar words in Māori, as well as by deep differences among the peoples on concepts of property rights and sovereignty. At Waitangi, the chiefs signed the Māori translation.

Land disputes and conflict

Despite conflicting interpretations of the provisions of the Treaty of Waitangi, relations between Māori and Europeans during the early colonial period were largely peaceful. Many Māori groups set up substantial businesses, supplying food and other products for domestic and overseas markets. Some of the early European settlers learned the Māori language and recorded Māori mythology, including George Grey, Governor of New Zealand from 1845 to 1855 and 1861–1868.

However, rising tensions over disputed land purchases and attempts by Māori in the Waikato to establish what some saw as a rival to the British system of royalty – viz. the Māori King Movement – led to the New Zealand wars in the 1860s. These conflicts started when rebel Māori attacked isolated settlers in Taranaki but were fought mainly between Crown troops – from both Britain and new regiments raised in Australia, aided by settlers and some allied Māori (known as kupapa) – and numerous Māori groups opposed to the disputed land sales, including some Waikato Māori.

While these conflicts resulted in few Māori (compared to the earlier Musket wars) or European deaths, the colonial government confiscated tracts of tribal land as punishment for what were called rebellions. In some cases the government confiscated land from tribes that had taken no part in the war, although this was almost immediately returned. Some of the confiscated land was returned to both kupapa and "rebel" Māori. Several minor conflicts also arose after the wars, including the incident at Parihaka in 1881 and the Dog Tax War from 1897 to 1898.

The Native Land Acts of 1862 and 1865 established the Native Land Court, which was intended to transfer Māori land from communal ownership into individual household title as a means to assimilation and to facilitate greater sales to European immigrants. Māori land under individual title became available to be sold to the colonial government or to settlers in private sales. In total 4 per cent of this was confiscated land, although about a quarter of this was returned. 300,000 acres was returned to Kupapa Māori mainly in the lower Waikato River Basin area. Individual Māori titleholders received considerable capital from these land sales, with some lower Waikato Chiefs being given 1000 pounds each. Disputes later arose over whether or not promised compensation in some sales was fully delivered. Some claim that later, the selling off of Māori land and the lack of appropriate skills hampered Māori participation in developing the New Zealand economy, eventually diminishing the capacity of many Māori to sustain themselves.

The Māori MP Henare Kaihau, from Waiuku, who was executive head of the King Movement, worked alongside King Mahuta to sell land to the government. At that time the king sold 185,000 acres per year. In 1910 the Māori Land Conference at Waihi discussed selling a further 600,000 acres. King Mahuta had been successful in getting restitution for some blocks of land previously confiscated, and these were returned to the King in his name. Henare Kaihau invested all the money, 50,000 pounds, in an Auckland land company which collapsed; all 50,000 pounds of the Kīngitanga money was lost.

In 1884 King Tāwhiao withdrew money from the Kīngitanga bank, Te Peeke o Aotearoa, to travel to London to see Queen Victoria and try to persuade her to honour the Treaty between their peoples. He did not get past the Secretary of State for the Colonies, who said it was a New Zealand problem. Returning to New Zealand, the Premier Robert Stout insisted that all events happening before 1863 were the responsibility of the Imperial Government.

By 1891 Māori comprised just 10 per cent of the population but still owned 17 per cent of the land, although much of it was of poor quality.

Decline and revival 

By the late 19th century a widespread belief existed amongst both Pākehā and Māori that the Māori population would cease to exist as a separate race or culture, and become assimilated into the European population. In 1840, New Zealand had a Māori population of about 50,000 to 70,000 and only about 2,000 Europeans. By 1860 the Europeans had increased to 50,000. The Māori population had declined to 37,520 in the 1871 census, although Te Rangi Hīroa (Sir Peter Buck) believed this figure was too low. The figure was 42,113 in the 1896 census, by which time Europeans numbered more than 700,000. Professor Ian Pool noticed that as late as 1890, 40 per cent of all female Māori children who were born died before the age of one, a much higher rate than for males.

The decline of the Māori population did not continue; it stabilised and began to recover. By 1936 the Māori figure was 82,326, although the sudden rise in the 1930s was probably due to the introduction of the family benefit, payable only when a birth was registered, according to Professor Pool. Despite a substantial level of intermarriage between the Māori and European populations, many ethnic Māori retained their cultural identity. A number of discourses developed as to the meaning of "Māori" and to who counted as Māori or not.

The parliament instituted four Māori seats in 1867, giving all Māori men universal suffrage, 12 years ahead of their European New Zealand counterparts. Until the 1879 general elections, men had to satisfy property requirements of landowning or rental payments to qualify as voters: owners of land worth at least £50, or payers of a certain amount in yearly rental (£10 for farmland or a city house, or £5 for a rural house). New Zealand was thus the first neo-European nation in the world to give the vote to its indigenous people. While the Māori seats encouraged Māori participation in politics, the relative size of the Māori population of the time vis à vis Pākehā would have warranted approximately 15 seats.

From the late 19th century, successful Māori politicians such as James Carroll, Āpirana Ngata, Te Rangi Hīroa and Maui Pomare, were influential in politics. At one point Carroll became Acting Prime Minister. The group, known as the Young Māori Party, cut across voting-blocs in Parliament and aimed to revitalise the Māori people after the devastation of the previous century. They believed the future path called for a degree of assimilation, with Māori adopting European practices such as Western medicine and education, especially learning English.

During the First World War, a Māori pioneer force was taken to Egypt but quickly was turned into a successful combat infantry battalion; in the last years of the war it was known as the "Māori Pioneer Battalion". It mainly comprised Te Arawa, Te Aitanga-a-Māhaki, Te Aitanga-a-Hauiti, Ngāti Porou and Ngāti Kahungunu and later many Cook Islanders; the Waikato and Taranaki tribes refused to enlist or be conscripted.

Māori were badly hit by the 1918 influenza epidemic when the Māori battalion returned from the Western Front. The death rate from influenza for Māori was 4.5 times higher than for Pākehā. Many Māori, especially in the Waikato, were very reluctant to visit a doctor and went to a hospital only when the patient was nearly dead. To cope with isolation, Waikato Māori, under Te Puea's leadership, increasingly returned to the old Pai Mārire (Hau hau) cult of the 1860s.

Until 1893, 53 years after the Treaty of Waitangi, Māori did not pay tax on land holdings. In 1893 a very light tax was payable only on leasehold land, and it was not till 1917 that Māori were required to pay a heavier tax equal to half that paid by other New Zealanders.

During the Second World War, the government decided to exempt Māori from the conscription that applied to other citizens. The Māori volunteered in large numbers, forming the 28th or Māori Battalion, which performed creditably, notably in Crete, North Africa and Italy. Altogether 16,000 Māori took part in the war. Māori, including Cook Islanders, made up 12 per cent of the total New Zealand force. 3,600 served in the Māori Battalion, the remainder serving in artillery, pioneers, home guard, infantry, airforce, and navy.

Recent history (1960s–present) 

Since the 1960s, Māoridom has undergone a cultural revival concurrent with activism for social justice and a protest movement. Government recognition of the growing political power of Māori and political activism have led to limited redress for confiscation of land and for the violation of other property rights. In 1975 the Crown set up the Waitangi Tribunal, a body with the powers of a Commission of Enquiry, to investigate and make recommendations on such issues, but it cannot make binding rulings; the Government need not accept the findings of the Waitangi Tribunal, and has rejected some of them. Since 1976, people of Māori descent may choose to enrol on either the general or Māori roll for general elections, and may vote in either Māori or general electorates, but not both.

During the 1990s and 2000s, the government negotiated with Māori to provide redress for breaches by the Crown of the guarantees set out in the Treaty of Waitangi in 1840. By 2006 the government had provided over NZ$900 million in settlements, much of it in the form of land deals. The largest settlement, signed on 25 June 2008 with seven Māori iwi, transferred nine large tracts of forested land to Māori control. As a result of the redress paid to many iwi, Māori now have significant interests in the fishing and forestry industries. There is a growing Māori leadership who are using the treaty settlements as an investment platform for economic development.

Despite a growing acceptance of Māori culture in wider New Zealand society, the settlements have generated controversy. Some people have complained that the settlements occur at a level of between 1 and 2.5 cents on the dollar of the value of the confiscated lands; conversely, some denounce the settlements and socioeconomic initiatives as amounting to race-based preferential treatment. Both of these sentiments were expressed during the New Zealand foreshore and seabed controversy in 2004.

See also 

 Pre-Māori settlement of New Zealand theories
 Māori mythology
 History of New Zealand
 History of Oceania

References

External links
 Māori history – New Zealand Government

 
History of New Zealand